Alex Braz da Silva (born 14 September 1984) is a former Brazilian professional football player who played as a defender.

Career
Alex Braz ended his career playing in the Romanian top division Liga I for Universitatea Cluj.

References

External links
 
 
 

1984 births
Living people
Brazilian footballers
FC Universitatea Cluj players
Liga I players
FC Akhmat Grozny players
Association football defenders
Expatriate footballers in Russia
Expatriate footballers in Romania
Brazilian expatriate sportspeople in Romania
Footballers from São Paulo